This article is about the particular significance of the year 1994 to Wales and its people.

Incumbents

Secretary of State for Wales – John Redwood
Archbishop of Wales – Alwyn Rice Jones, Bishop of St Asaph
Archdruid of the National Eisteddfod of Wales – John Gwilym Jones

Events
26 January – A man fires two blank shots at the Prince of Wales (now Charles III), during the prince's visit to Sydney, Australia.
10 February – An earthquake shock measuring 2.9 on the Richter scale is experienced within a 50-mile radius of the epicentre near Bangor, Wales.
18 March – An earthquake shock measuring 3.1 on the Richter scale is experienced within a 30-mile radius of the epicentre near Newtown, Montgomeryshire.
1 April – At Coney Beach Pleasure Park, Porthcawl, a 9-year-old boy is killed after being flung off the 58-year-old "Water Chute" ride when a steel hoop collapses in wet and windy conditions and falls onto the open-topped carriage in which he is travelling.
29 June – In a televised interview with Jonathan Dimbleby, the Prince of Wales admits having committed adultery after the breakdown of his marriage.
19 July – Glenys Kinnock is elected to the European Parliament.
24 July – Explosion at Pembroke Refinery injures 26.
28 August – Sunday trading becomes legal in England and Wales for the first time.
10 September – Bryn Terfel is guest soloist at the Last Night of the Proms in London.
Dr Elizabeth Haywood is the first winner of the Welsh Woman of the Year award.
Miners at the Tower Colliery in South Wales, led by Tyrone O'Sullivan, set up TEBO (Tower Employees Buy-Out) to try to save their mine.
Work begins on the Cardiff Bay barrage.
St Davids (population 2,000) is restored to city status in the United Kingdom at the request of the Queen, confirmed by letters patent presented on 1 June 1995.

Arts and literature
Foundation of the Harlech Biennale visual arts festival.

Awards
National Eisteddfod of Wales (held in Neath)
National Eisteddfod of Wales: Chair – Emyr Lewis, "Chwyldro"
National Eisteddfod of Wales: Crown – Gerwyn Williams, "Dolenni"
National Eisteddfod of Wales: Prose Medal – Robin Llywelyn, O'r Harbwr Gwag i'r Cefnfor Gwyn
Gwobr Goffa Daniel Owen - Eirug Wyn
Wales Book of the Year:
English language: Paul Ferris, Caitlin
Welsh language: Robin Chapman, W. J. Gruffydd
Aventis Prize – Steve Jones, The Language of the Genes
Glyndŵr Award – Ian Parrott (composer)

New books

English language
John Davies – A History of Wales
Jonathan Dimbleby – The Prince of Wales: a Biography
Mike Jenkins – Graffiti Narratives
John May – Reference Wales
Jenny Rees – Looking for Mr Nobody; The Secret Life of Goronwy Rees

Welsh language
Donald Evans – Wrth Reddf
Bobi Jones – Crist a Chenedlaetholdeb (Christ and Nationalism)
Esyllt T. Lawrence - Cyn y Wawr
Mihangel Morgan - Te Gyda'r Frenhines

New music
Gorky's Zygotic Mynci - Tatay (album)
Karl Jenkins - Adiemus: Songs of Sanctuary

Film
Keith Allen plays the mysterious lodger in Shallow Grave.

Welsh-language films
Branwen (Ceri Sherlock)
Hedd Wyn
Tân ar y Comin (premièred 1 January on S4C television)
Ymadawiad Arthur

Music
John Cale performs a spoken-word duet with Suzanne Vega on the song "The Long Voyage" on Hector Zazou's album Chansons des mers froides.
Shakin' Stevens gives up recording.

Albums
Bryn Fôn – Dyddiau Di-gymar
Dafydd Iwan – Caneuon Gwerin

Broadcasting

Welsh-language television
Gogs (animation)
Gwalia yng Nghasia (documentary)
Yr Heliwr ("A Mind to Kill") (drama)
Pengelli
Uned 5 (children's)

English-language television
Wales Tonight (HTV)

Sport

BBC Wales Sports Personality of the Year – Steve Robinson
Commonwealth Games – The Wales team wins a total of 19 medals, including five golds (Colin Jackson, 110m hurdles; Neil Winter, pole vault; Michael Jay, rapid-fire pistol; David Morgan, middleweight weightlifting snatch and overall middleweight title).
Football – Vinnie Jones is chosen to captain the Wales international side.
Golf – Ian Woosnam wins the British Masters tournament.

Births
7 February – Nathan Walker, Welsh-Australian ice hockey player
30 June – Rhys Jones, sprinter 
2 July – Jessica Leigh Jones, engineer
7 September – Elinor Barker, cyclist
6 October – Joe Woolford, singer
date unknown – Rhys Morgan, health blogger

Deaths
1 January – Allen Forward, Wales international rugby union player, 72
23 March – Donald Swann, musician, 70
30 April – Herbert Bowden, Baron Aylestone, politician, 89
21 May – Cliff Wilson, snooker player, 60
31 May – Tom Lewis, Wales international rugby union player, 89
27 June – Jeremy Brooks, novelist, poet and dramatist, 67
24 July – Aubrey Davies, cricketer, 79
29 July – William Mathias, composer, 57
31 July – Caitlin Macnamara, widow of Dylan Thomas, 80
23 August – Wat Jones, cricketer, 77
1 September – Dr Roger Thomas, politician, 68
4 October – F. Gwendolen Rees, zoologist, 88
9 October – Idris Hopkins, footballer, 83
17 October – Gus Risman, rugby league player, 83
28 October – Steve Curtis, boxer, 45
6 December – Alun Owen, screenwriter, 69
12 December – Stuart Evans, writer, 60
29 December – Jack Rippon, cricketer, 76
31 December – Harri Webb, poet, 74
date unknown
Colin Edwards, writer, 69/70
Elisabeth Inglis-Jones, writer, 93/4

See also
1994 in Northern Ireland

References

 
Wales